There are two genera of lizards named fat-tailed geckos:
 Diplodactylus, all species found in Australia
 Hemitheconyx, both species found in Africa